Northwest A&F University (NWAFU) is a key national public research university in Xianyang, Shaanxi, China, under the administration of the Ministry of Education.  

NWAFU is a member of the “Project 985" club, which is an organization of the top 39 elite universities in China. It is also a Class B Double First Class University designated by the Chinese central government, which aims to comprehensively develop elite Chinese universities into world-class institutions.  

As of 2023, the university is ranked 590th globally by USNews Global Universities Rankings. Its "agricultural sciences" program is ranked 12th in the world. Regarding scientific research output, the Nature Index 2022 placed NWAFU 334th in the world. 

The university has an annual income of around RMB 1.72 billion (around £172 million) in 2011. By April 2013, the university had 1661 faculty members and 28,964 students.

History

Origins and re-organization 
Northwest A&F University originated from National Northwest Junior College of Agriculture and Forestry founded in 1934, which was the earliest institution of higher agriculture and forestry education in northwest China. Since its establishment, NWAFU has been closely bound up with the fate of the country and the nation, assuming the responsibility of rejuvenating northwest China, boosting agricultural prosperity, and cultivating talents.

In September 1999, Northwest A&F University was established by merging five scientific research institutions and two universities in Yangling, Shaanxi Province, namely
 Institute of Soil and Water Conservation, Chinese Academy of Sciences
 Northwest China Institute of Water Resource Sciences, Ministry of Water Resources of China
 Shaanxi Academy of Agricultural Sciences
 Shaanxi Academy of Forestry
 Northwest China Institute of Botany, Chinese Academy of Sciences and Shaanxi Province
 Northwest Agricultural University
 Northwest Forestry College.

The 7 members involved in re-organization were very close to each other historically. Northwest Agricultural University has the biggest area and the longest history out of 7 members and are the origin of Institute of Water Resource Sciences (Northwest China) and Northwest Forestry College. Her history can be dated back to 1934(Year 23 in Minguo calendar) when National Northwest Senior College of Agriculture and Forestry (the predecessor of Northwest Agricultural University) was founded by the Senior Politician of Kuomintang Mr. Yu Youren, Kuomintang veteran member Dai Jitao, Kuomintang General Yang Hucheng. In 1937 and 1938, the Senior College merged with College of Agriculture of National Northwest Associated University and Department of Animal Husbandry in College of Agriculture of National Henan University respectively, then was renamed as National Northwest Agricultural College. Meanwhile, Department of Water Conservancy of National Lanzhou University  joined the college. Following the establishment of P.R.China in 1949, "National" was deleted from the college name although it remains a government funded academic school. In 1952, Department of Agricultural Water Conservancy was partially given to Xi'an Jiaotong University  under the order of The State Council. 2 years later, the remained Department of Agricultural Water Conservancy became an independent academic institution which is the mold of Institute of Water Resource Sciences (Northwest China). In 1979, Northwest Forestry College came out to be an independent school from Department of Forestry in Northwest Agricultural College. In 1985, with the approval of the Ministry of Agriculture, Animal Husbandry and Fishery, the university name changed to be Northwest Agricultural University.
Other institutions have relatively shorter history. Institute of Botany (Northwest China) became an independent academy from Institute of Soil and Water Conservation, Chinese Academy of Sciences (founded in 1956) in 1965. In 1980, Shaanxi Academy of Forestry got separated from Shaanxi Academy of Agricultural Sciences (founded in 1952).

The State Council agreed to merge 7 organizations as new Northwest A&F University  in a reply to the proposal drafted by Ministry of Education and Shaanxi Province Government. A financial budget of 600,000,000 RMB was granted as start fund and further investment plan as well as related issue such as reshuffle were also briefly stated in this official reply. On 11 September 1999, a central government delegation led by Vice Premier Li Lanqing attended the opening ceremony and made the announcement.

List of presidents 
Chancellor/Communist Party Committee Secretary since new A&F(1999)

President
 1999.9 – 2003.8 Mr. Chen, Zongxing  (陈宗兴)
 2003.8 – 2011.1 Professor. Sun, Wuxue
 2011.1 – 2017.7 Professor Sun, Qixin
 2017.12 - present Professor Wu, Pute

Communist Party Committee Secretary of A&F
 1999.9 – 2003.8 Professor Sun, Wuxue
 2003.8 – 2013.5 Professor. Zhang, Guangqiang
 2013.5 – 2015.8 Dr. Liang, Gui
 2015.8 – present Mr. Li, Xingwang

Academic colleges 
The university is composed of 23 academic faculties (colleges, schools or departments) including Institute of Water and Soil Conservation, and Institute of Ideological and Political Education. These colleges, departments and schools are in charge of undergraduate studies, offering 3,000 courses. All of them are listed below:
 College of Agronomy (Academy of Agricultural Sciences) 
 College of Horticulture
 College of Plant Protection
 College of Forestry (Academy of Forestry) 
 College of Animal Science and Technology
 College of Veterinary Medicine
 College of Life Sciences
 College of Enology
 College of Sciences
 College of Chemistry and Pharmacy
 College of Information Engineering
 College of Mechanical and Electric Engineering
 College of Water Resources and Architectural Engineering
 College of Food Science and Engineering
 College of Natural Resources and Environment
 College of Economics and Management
 Innovation Experimental College
 College of Humanities
 International School
 Department of Foreign Languages
 Department of Physical Education
 College of Vocational and Adult Education
 College of Landscape Architecture and Arts
 Institute of Water and Soil Conservation
 Institute of Ideological and Political Education
 Innovation Experimental College

Campus and students life 

The university urban area is around 3.94 km2, covering two main campuses: North Campus and South Campus. Besides, Institute of Water and Soil Conservation, College of Food Science and Engineering and College of Water Resources and Architectural Engineering have their own independent campuses for administrative affairs and research respectively. 

Generally, South Campus hosts study and living facilities for senior undergraduates from College of Agriculture, College of Horticulture, College of Forestry, College of Water Resources and Architectural Engineering, College of Resource and Environment and College of Economics and Management. All students from International School, most of postgraduates, undergraduates from Department of Arts (Landscape Arts Design) and all students from College of Vocational and Adult Education also live and study in South Campus.

Although North Campus is mainly for undergraduates of other colleges, some postgraduates move to North Campus for their research since they become the 2nd year students. On South Campus, Agriculture Science Building, Social Science Building, new apartments as well as students facilities are under construction now. Study and living environment will be greatly improved when these buildings are available. Besides, A&F provides vehicles (small bus) to ferry students and staff between South Campus and North Campus on a daily schedule.

The Museum Garden (a collection of 5 museums including insects, animals, plants, soil and China's agricultural history) is located beside South Campus. The Insects Museum holds the most extensive collection of butterflies in China's Universities. This garden is also the greatest Agriculture-themed museum area in China. Besides its teaching role for A&F students, this garden is also serving as a popular science centre in Shaanxi Province and attracts thousands of visitors especially young students every year.

A&F provides convenient sports facilities to staff and students. Across the campuses, there are 12 tennis courts, 1 indoor stadium, 2 outdoor stadiums, 1 arena for volleyball and basketball, 2 outdoor swimming pools, 48 outdoor basketball courts, 28 outdoor volleyball courts, several badminton courts and 143 outdoor tables for Ping-Pong. Tennis is popular across the campus and tennis championships are held every year. A&F also supports College Students Basketball and Volleyball Team to gain reputation in CUBA (Chinese University Basketball Association) and CUVA (Chinese University Volleyball Association). 

The university library was initially launched in 1934 and got extended in 1999 when new A&F was established. In both North and South Campus, the well equipped air-conditioning system in the library makes it a popular site for students' study, especially in summer. A training centre for engineering in North Campus provides engineering courses and practices to all undergraduates, especially students majored at mechanics and electronics. At the heart of North Campus stands the tallest building of A&F, the ten-storey NO. 8 Teaching Building. Along with its 12 subsidiary great lecture halls, they serve as the teaching centre in North Campus. 

Chefs in 11 cafeterias scattered in the 2 main campuses cook breakfast, lunch and supper to students and staff every day in each term. However, the cafeterias are usually very busy and crowded at dining time. Among these cafeterias, 2 Muslim cafeterias are specially built to cater for the needs of Muslim group. Food safety in these cafeterias is seriously controlled to provide good quality food. Campus Card (a campus identity card which acts like a Debit card to facilitate payment across campuses) is needed to buy food in all cafeterias but cash is also accepted.

Totally 48 dorm buildings are available for students. For Chinese students, 4 or 6 students share 1 bedroom while international students live in single or double bedroom equipped with bathroom and toilet (the price is much higher). Air conditioning in all students dormitories will be available since summer of 2015. As a part of International A&F project, new apartments for international students and foreign experts will be ready since 2015. All apartments and dormitories are centrally heated in winter from 15 November to 15 March next year.

Campus events are usually hold in Xiu-Shan Students Venue Centre in North and South Campus. Xiu-Shan was named after Xiu-Shan Zhu, the father of a Taiwanese entrepreneur Yinglong Zhu who endowed NWAFU. Now, Xiu-Shan Students Venue is an important place for campus events such as exhibition, concert, gala and conferences.

Rankings and Reputation 

The university ranks as Top 3 research and teaching quality in China's agriculture universities and is a member of "Project 985" club which is an organization of 39 reputable universities in China. Northwest A&F University's research achievements are dominant in the fields of agriculture biology including wheat breeding, entomology, agriculture resource management, horticulture, plant protection, food science (especially in Enology), forestry and veterinary. Besides, the university is also reputable in agricultural water conservancy, agriculture economics and management, agriculture mechanics and information engineering and ancient agricultural history research.

In 2017, Times Higher Education World University Rankings ranked the university within the 801-1000 band globally.

In 2022, the "Agriculture Science" subject was ranked 11th globally by U.S. News & World Report Best Global University Rankings 2022. Meanwhile, "Plant and Animal Science" was ranked 86th globally by the same ranking. The overall global ranking of NWAFU by the U.S. News & World Report Best Global University Rankings 2021 is 613.

In 2022, Academic Ranking of World Universities (ARWU) ranked the university at 401-500 band globally.

See also
China-UK Sustainable Agriculture Innovation Network

References

External links
 Official website 
 Official website 

 
Universities and colleges in Shaanxi
Forestry in China
Forestry education
Vice-ministerial universities in China
Xianyang
1934 establishments in China
Educational institutions established in 1934